The Saint Kevin's Way is a pilgrim path in County Wicklow, Ireland. An alternative spur route begins at Valleymount and joins the main trail at Ballinagee Bridge. It is typically completed in one day.

The trail follows in the footsteps of Caoimhín Naofa who crossed the Wicklow Mountains and founded the monastery at Glendalough in the 6th century. The journey later became a route of pilgrimage for visitors to Glendalough. It is one of a series of medieval pilgrim paths developed as walking trails by the Heritage Council.

In 2016, Saint Kevin's Way became part of the new National Pilgrim Passport for Ireland. The new passport offers an opportunity to walk 125 km of Ireland’s medieval pilgrim paths, with stamping points at the conclusion of each participating path. On completion of all five paths, participants are entitled to an Irish Pilgrim Paths completion certificate (Teastas Oilithreachta) from Ballintubber Abbey, Co Mayo.
The four routes currently in the Pilgrim Passport along with St Kevin’s Way are: Tochar Phádraig, Mayo; Cosán na Naomh, Kerry; Cnoc na dTobar, Kerry; St. Finbarr's Pilgrim Path, Cork.

See also

Pilgrim Paths of Ireland
Lists of long-distance trails in the Republic of Ireland

References

External links
 St Kevin's Way at the Heritage Council
 St Kevin's Way at IrishTrails.ie
 Glendalough Pilgrimage at FaceBook

Historic trails and roads in Ireland
Geography of County Wicklow
Tourist attractions in County Wicklow
Pilgrimage routes